Gary Don Libecap (born 1946) is a Distinguished Professor of Corporate Environmental Management at the Bren School of Environmental Science & Management and Distinguished Professor of Economics at the University of California Santa Barbara. Libecap is a research associate at the National Bureau of Economic Research; a research fellow at the Hoover Institution; and a senior fellow at the Property and Environment Research Center, and a member of the Research Group on Political Institutions and Economic Policy, Harvard University. He was the Pitt Professor of American History and Institutions at Cambridge University 2010-11, and was previously the Anheuser Busch Professor of Entrepreneurial Studies, Economics, and Law at the University of Arizona.

Libecap's research focuses on the role of property rights institutions in addressing the open access losses for natural resources such as fisheries and freshwater, as well as the role of water markets in encouraging efficient use and allocation. Libecap has authored or coauthored over 200 scholarly papers in peer-reviewed journals, has lectured widely, and written articles that have appeared in the New York Times and the Wall Street Journal.

Other Institutions 
 University of Arizona
 Cambridge University
 Texas A&M University
 University of New Mexico
 University of Paris
 Free University of Berlin

Appointed Positions 
 Member, Global Think Tank on Wild Ocean Fisheries Management, World Wildlife Fund, 2015–Present
 Advisory Committee: Ostrom Workshop, Indiana University, 2015–Present
 Advisory Group: Water in the West, Stanford Woods Institute and Bill Lane Center, Stanford University, 2015–Present
 Fellow, the Economics and Science Group, Australian National University, 2015–Present
 Advisor Committee, UC Institute on Global Conflict and Cooperation, IGCC, 2013–16
 Member, Scientific Committee, International Center for Economic Research, Turin Italy, 2007-2014
 Member, Advisory Committee on Environmental Research and Education, National Science Foundation, 2005–08
 Member of various NSF research review panels.

Books 
 Contracting for Property Rights. New York: Cambridge University Press, 1989.
 (ed. with Claudia Goldin) The Political Economy of Regulation: An Historical Analysis of Government and the Economy. University of Chicago Press and NBER, 1994.
 (with Ronald Johnson) The Federal Civil Service System and the Problem of Bureaucracy: The Economics and Politics of Institutional Change. University of Chicago Press and NBER, 1994.
 (with Lee Alston and Bernardo Mueller) Titles, Conflict and Land Use: The Development of Property Rights and Land Reform on the Brazilian Amazon Frontier. University of Michigan Press, 1999.
 (ed. with Price V. Fishback and Edward Zajac) Public Choice Essays in Honor of a Maverick Scholar: Gordon Tullock. Kluwer Academic, 2000.
 Owens Valley Revisited: A Reassessment of the West’s First Great Water Transfer. Stanford University Press, 2007.
 (ed. with Richard Steckel) The Economics of Climate Change: Adaptations Past and Present. University of Chicago Press and NBER. May, 2011.
 (with Terry L. Anderson) Environmental Markets: A Property Rights Approach. Cambridge University Press, 2014.
 (with Robert Glennon and Peter W. Culp) Shopping for Water: How the Market Can Mitigate Water Shortages in the American West. Washington DC: Island Press.

Selected publications
 (with R. N. Johnson) "Contracting Problems and Regulation:  The Case of the Fishery", American Economic Review, December, 1982.
 (with S. N. Wiggins) "Contractual Responses to the Common Pool: Prorationing of Crude Oil Production", American Economic Review, March, 1984.
 (with S. N. Wiggins) "Oil Field Unitization:  Contractual Failure in the Presence of Imperfect Information", American Economic Review, June, 1985.
 (with S. N. Wiggins) "The Influence of Private Contractual Failure on Regulation:  The Case of Oil Field Unitization", Journal of Political Economy, August, 1985.
 (with R. N. Johnson) "Bureaucratic Rules, Supervisor Behavior, and the Effect on Salaries in the Federal Government", Journal of Law, Economics, and Organization, March, 1989.]
 (with R. N. Johnson) "Public Sector Employee Voter Participation and Salaries", Public Choice, January, 1991.]
 (with R. N. Johnson) "Patronage to Merit and Control of the Federal Government Labor Force", Explorations in Economic History, January, 1994.
 (with R. N. Johnson) "Courts, A Protected Bureaucracy, and Reinventing Government", Arizona Law Review, Fall, 1995.]
 (with Lee Alston and Robert Schneider) “The Determinants and Impact of Property Rights: Land Titles on the Brazilian Frontier”, Journal of Law, Economics and Organization, April, 1996.
 “Common Property,” in Peter Newman, ed., The New Palgrave Dictionary of Economics and the Law, 1998.
 “Unitization,” in Peter Newman, ed., The New Palgrave Dictionary of Economics and the Law 1998.
 (with James Smith) “The Self-Enforcing Provisions of Oil and Gas Unit Operating Agreements: Theory and Evidence”, Journal of Law, Economics and Organization, July, 1999.
 (with Ronald Johnson) “Transactions Costs and Coalition Stability under Majority Rule”, Economic Inquiry, lead article, April, 2003.
 (with Zeynep Hansen) “Small Farms, Externalities, and the Dust Bowl of the 1930s”,  Journal of Political Economy, June, 2004.
 “The Assignment of Property Rights on the Western Frontier: Lessons for Contemporary Environmental and Resource Policy”, Journal of Economic History. June, 2007.]
 (with Jedidiah Brewer, Robert Glennon, and Alan Ker) “Water Markets in the West: Prices, Trading, and Contractual Forms”, Economic Inquiry, April, 2008.]
 “Chinatown Revisited: Owens Valley and Los Angeles—Bargaining Costs and Fairness Perceptions of the First Major Water Rights Exchange”, Journal of Law, Economics and Organization, October, 2009.
 “Open-Access Losses and Delay in the Assignment of Property Rights”, Arizona Law Review, 2008.
 (with Terry Anderson and Ragnar Arnason) “Efficiency Advantages of Grandfathering in Rights-Based Fisheries Management”, Annual Review of Resource Economics, October, 2011.
 “Institutional Path Dependence in Adaptation to Climate: Coman’s “Some Unsettled Problems of Irrigation”, American Economic Review, February, 2011.
 (with Dean Lueck) “The Demarcation of Land and the Role of Coordinating Institutions”, Journal of Political Economy, June, 2011.
 (with Dean Lueck and Trevor O’Grady) "Large Scale Institutional Changes: Land Demarcation within the British Empire", Journal of Law and Economics, November, 2011.
 “Addressing Global Environmental Externalities: Transaction Costs Considerations”, Journal of Economic Literature, June, 2014.

References 



1946 births
Living people
21st-century American economists
Economic historians
Place of birth missing (living people)
Hoover Institution people
Presidents of the Economic History Association